Les Mason State Park is a public recreation area on the east shore of Whitefish Lake, four miles north of Whitefish, Montana. The day-use state park encompasses eight acres that include a 585-foot sand and gravel beach, short walking trails, and facilities for swimming, canoeing, and picnicking.

References

External links 
Les Mason State Park Montana Fish, Wildlife & Parks
Les Mason State Park Trail Map Montana Fish, Wildlife & Parks

State parks of Montana
Protected areas of Flathead County, Montana
Protected areas established in 1983
1983 establishments in Montana